TouchArcade is a mobile video game website that launched in 2008. Arnold Kim of MacRumors worked on the site and its editor-in-chief was Eli Hodapp from 2009 to 2019.

TouchArcade has been recognized as one of the best mobile game news websites. Games journalists also described TouchArcades Hodapp as influential within the mobile game community.

History 
The site unveiled a dedicated iOS app in 2012. Early the next year, TouchArcade began a promotion called Free Play, wherein the website promoted a game that was made free to download for the promotion's duration. TouchArcade launched a crowdfunding campaign in June 2015.

Content 
TouchArcade publishes news stories and reviews Monday through Friday about iOS and Android video games. A daily SwitchArcade feature covers releases and sales for the Nintendo Switch console. The site also produces a weekly podcast entitled The TouchArcade Show in which Jared Nelson and former editor-in-chief Eli Hodapp discuss top news stories of the week. Registered users receive a monthly email newsletter of the best game releases of the past month, and the site has traditionally rolled up a "best of" feature for the end of the year. In 2022, TouchArcade began covering other portable platforms such as Steam Deck and  Playdate.

References

External links 

Video game news websites
American gaming websites
Internet properties established in 2008